"Power Ponies" is the sixth episode of the fourth season as well as the 71st episode overall. In the episode, Spike, Twilight Sparkle, Rainbow Dash, Fluttershy, Applejack, Rarity, and Pinkie Pie are transported into a comic book where they become its characters. To escape, they must defeat the Mane-iac, the villain of the book. The episode was heavily influenced by comic books, including having a more modern and futuristic style. Upon its airing on December 21, 2013, on the Hub Network, it was viewed by over 600,000 people.

Plot 
Spike finds himself unneeded while his friends clean up Princess Celestia and Princess Luna's old castle, so he goes off to read a Power Ponies superhero comic issue, unaware that it possesses magical powers. When he reaches the end, he finds the book's ending to be missing. After reading the cryptic text one the last page, he and his friends are sucked into the comic book. In the comic, the ponies get transformed and assume the personas of the Power Ponies: Twilight Sparkle is transformed into Masked Matter-Horn, who can shoot power beams; Pinkie Pie into Fili-Second, who has super speed; Rainbow Dash into Zapp, who can control nature; Rarity into Radiance, who can create objects with her bracelets; Applejack into Mistress Mare-velous, who is psychically connected to her lasso; and Fluttershy into Saddle Rager, who turns into a monster when she loses her temper, while Spike is transformed into their bumbling sidekick, Hum Drum, to his annoyance.

The ponies learn that they must defeat the supervillain Mane-iac in order to escape the comic, but their clumsiness with their newfound powers causes the Mane-iac to spray them with her "Hairspray Ray of Doom", which freezes them and disables their powers. All but Spike are trapped. As the Mane-iac threatens them with her doomsday weapon, which will cause every pony's hair to grow wild, Spike hides, feeling useless. However, after the Mane-iac insults Humdrum, the ponies assert that Spike always comes through for them when they need him. Spike is able to use the distraction to trap the Mane-iac's henchmen and free the others, allowing them to stop the Mane-iac. Fluttershy, reluctant to join the battle, turns to leave, but the Mane-iac spots her and tries to shoot her with a cannon. A firefly blocks the Mane-iac's sights and she hits it. This angers Fluttershy, causing her to turn into a rage monster and defeat the Mane-iac. The ponies safely return home to Equestria and assure Spike that while they may not always need him, he is not useless. The comic later disappears.

Production 
The episode's style was influenced by comic books, making the cityscapes more distinct. Its perspective was harder than usual, with "strong parallaxes that show the dynamic viewpoint of comics." Unlike the series' normal setting, the episode featured a more modern and futuristic setting. The Power Ponies were also based on comic superheroes. The Mane-iac is a parody of the Joker.

Two exclusive Mane-iac toys were offered at the 2014 San Diego Comic-Con, a pony version and an Equestria Girls version.

Broadcast and reception

Ratings 
"Power Ponies" aired on the Hub Network on December 21, 2013. It was viewed by an estimated 683,000 people and approximately 0.3 percent of households, according to Nielsen ratings.

Critical reception 
Daniel Alvarez of Unleash the Fanboy gave the episode 3.5 out 5 stars. While not considering it a "great" episode, Alvarez called it a "fun episode", particularly because of Pinkie Pie's use of her superpowers, Fluttershy's "hulk[...]-out", and the Mane-iac. However, he cited the episode's spotlight on Spike and the absence of a grand battle as detractors.

References

Book

External links 
 

My Little Pony: Friendship Is Magic episodes
2013 American television episodes
2013 Canadian television episodes
Television episodes about comics